Shih Pei-chun (born 23 February 1980) is a Taiwanese judoka who competed in the 2000 Summer Olympics and in the 2008 Summer Olympics.

References

1980 births
Living people
Taiwanese female judoka
Olympic judoka of Taiwan
Judoka at the 2000 Summer Olympics
Judoka at the 2008 Summer Olympics
21st-century Taiwanese women